Wu Chun-tsai (born 19 April 1930) is a Taiwanese athlete. He competed in the men's triple jump at the 1956 Summer Olympics.

References

External links
 

1930 births
Possibly living people
Athletes (track and field) at the 1956 Summer Olympics
Taiwanese male triple jumpers
Olympic athletes of Taiwan
Place of birth missing (living people)